Aspire Foundation is a non-profit organization that mentors women in the non-profit sector.

Organizational goals
The organization has a goal of empowering one billion women by 2020 to be leaders in their communities.

Founding
The Aspire Foundation was founded by Dr. Sam Collins in the United Kingdom.  The first group of leaders to participate were from Women for Women International.

Current initiatives
The Aspire Foundation has partnered with Avanade to encourage women to be leaders in the technology sector.

References

Non-profit organisations based in the United Kingdom
Year of establishment missing